Toaripi, or East Elema, is a Trans–New Guinea language of Papua New Guinea.

External links 
 Paradisec has a number of collections with Toaripi language materials.

References

Eleman languages
Languages of Gulf Province